The Women's long jump at the 1952 Olympic Games took place on July 23 at the Helsinki Olympic Stadium. Yvette Williams from New Zealand won the gold medal and set a new Olympic record.

Records
Prior to this competition, the existing world and Olympic records were as follows.

The following new Olympic records was set during this competition.

Results

Qualifying round

Qualifying Performance 5.30 advance to the Final.

Final

NM — No Mark

References

External links
Official Olympic Report, la84.org.

Athletics at the 1952 Summer Olympics
Long jump at the Olympics
1952 in women's athletics
Women's events at the 1952 Summer Olympics